The 2018–19 Northern Football League season is the 121st in the history of Northern Football League, a football competition in England.

Division One

Division One should consist of 20 clubs, however Team Northumbria resigned from the league and disbanded during the close season, and Blyth resigned shortly after the start of the season, after playing four games.

The following 5 clubs left Division One before the season -
 Billingham Synthonia – relegated to Division Two
 Jarrow Roofing Boldon Community Association F.C. – folded
 Marske United - promoted to Northern Premier League Division One East
 Morpeth Town - promoted to Northern Premier League Division One East
 Washington – relegated to Division Two

The following 3 clubs joined Division One before the season -
 Blyth – promoted from Division Two
 Hebburn Town – promoted from Division Two
 Whickham – promoted from Division Two

Stadia and locations

League table

Division Two

Division Two consists of 20 clubs.

The following 5 clubs left Division Two before the season -
 Alnwick Town - relegated to Northern Alliance
 Blyth – promoted to Division One
 Darlington Railway Athletic - relegated to Wearside League
 Hebburn Town – promoted to Division One
 Whickham – promoted to Division One

The following 4 clubs joined Division Two before the season -
 Billingham Synthonia – relegated from Division One
 Birtley Town - promoted from Northern Alliance
 Redcar Athletic - promoted from Wearside League
 Washington – relegated from Division One

Stadia and locations

League table

References

External links
 Northern Football League

2018-19
9